The 2017 Silicon Valley Sevens was a one-time international Rugby sevens competition held in San Jose, California at the Avaya Stadium on November 4th and 5th, 2017, produced and hosted by United World Sports. The tournament marked both the first such held on American soil outside of the USA Sevens and the first time the Ireland national rugby sevens team competed in the United States.

Competed alongside the international competition was the eight-team Penn Mutual Collegiate Rugby Fall Classic at Silicon Valley 7s . The first three teams announced were from the nearby universities of Stanford, Santa Clara, and USC. The collegiate competition was a double-elimination format and included schools from three different states (Arizona, California (6), and Washington).

Format
The teams were drawn into three pools of four teams each. Each team plays every other team in their pool once. The top eight teams from pool play advanced to the Cup bracket. The bottom four teams go to the Bowl bracket.

Teams

Pool stage
All times in Pacific Standard Time (UTC−08:00). The pools were scheduled as follows:

Pool A

Pool B

Pool C

Source: Rugby Today
Source: SevensRugby.com

Knockout stage

Bowl

Fifth place

Cup

Source: Rugby Today
Source: Rugby Today

Tournament placings

Source: SevensRugby.com

Players

Scoring leaders

Source: SevensRugby.com

Dream Team
The following seven players were selected to the tournament Dream Team at the conclusion of the tournament:

Penn Mutual Silicon Valley 7s Fall Collegiate Classic

Format
The tournament was conducted under a double-elimination format. The winners of each first-round contest would continue in the winners' bracket and face the other winners from the first round. The two sides having won both their first and second matches advanced immediately to semifinal #1. The two sides having lost both their first and second matches were eliminated. And the four remaining sides to have posted 1–1 records through the first day of play advanced to compete in one of the two losers' bracket matchups on day 2. The winners of each of those losers' bracket contests competed against each other, with the winner advancing to play the loser of semifinal #1 in semifinal #2. The winner of semifinal #2 advanced to a winner-take-all final against the thus far undefeated winner of semifinal #1.

Source: Rugby Today

Teams

Source: Rugby Today

Competition

All times in Pacific Standard Time (UTC−08:00).

Round 1

Losers' Bracket Round 2

Winners' Bracket Round 2

Losers' Bracket Round 3

Winners' Bracket Semifinal

Losers' Bracket Round 4

Losers' Bracket Semifinal

Final

Source: Rugby Today
Source: Flo Rugby

Tournament placings

References

External links
Tournament page

Silicon Valley Sevens
Silicon Valley Sevens
Silicon Valley Sevens
Silicon Valley Sevens